Mink is a surname. Notable people with the surname include:

 Ben Mink (born 1951), Canadian musician
 Claudette Mink (born 1971), Canadian actress
 Douglas J. Mink, American scientist
 Graham Mink (born 1979), American ice hockey player
 James Mink, Canadian businessman and politician
 Len Mink, Christian evangelist and musician
 Louis Mink (1921–1983), American philosopher of history
 Patsy Mink (1927–2002), American politician
 Scott Andrew Mink (1963–2004), American murderer
 Meesha Mink, pseudonym of Niobia Bryant, an African-American novelist of romance and mainstream fiction
 Ken Mink (born 1935), American who, at the age of 73, is believed to be the oldest person ever to score in a college basketball game
 Oscar Mink (1930–2004), American academic
 Paule Mink (died 1901), born Adèle Paulina Mekarska, was a French feminist and socialist revolutionary
 Olivér Mink (born 1970), Hungarian retired football player and football coach, currently the head coach of Hungarian first division club Pécsi MFC
 Wilhelm Mink, German entomologist.